Figure skating at the 1980 Winter Olympics took place at the Olympic Center Arena in Lake Placid, New York, United States.

Medal table

Participating NOCs
Twenty nations sent figure skaters to compete in the events at Lake Placid.

Results

Men

Note: Soviet officials withdrew Kovalev from the competition after he placed 5th in compulsory figures.

Referee:
  Sonia Bianchetti

Assistant Referee:
  Elemér Terták

Judges:
  Alice Pinos
  Walburga Grimm
  Tatiana Danilenko
  Ramona McIntyre
  Alain Calmat
  Britta Lindgren
  Sally-Anne Stapleford
  Elfride Beyer
  Tsukasa Kimura
  Jacqueline Kendall-Baker (substitute)

Ladies

Referee:
  Benjamin T. Wright

Assistant Referee:
  Donald H. Gilchrist

Judges:
  Wolfgang Kunz
  Ludwig Gassner
  Kinuko Ueno
  Charles U. Foster
  Radovan Lipovšćak
  Leena Vainio
  Giorgio Siniscalco
  Ingrid Linke
  Markus Germann
  Sergei Kononykhin (substitute)

Pairs
Medal favorites Tai Babilonia / Randy Gardner were forced to withdraw before the competition due to an injury to Gardner.

Referee:
  Hermann Schiechtl

Assistant Referee:
  Oskar Madl

Judges:
  Walburga Grimm
  Hugh C. Graham Jr.
  Alain Calmat
  Dennis McFarlane
  Jacqueline Kendall-Baker
  Milan Duchón
  Elfriede Beyer
  Kinuko Ueno
  Sergei Kononykhin
  Ludwig Gassner (substitute)

Ice dance

Referee:
  Lawrence Demmy

Assistant Referee:
  Edith Shoemaker

Judges:
  Wolfgang Kunz
  Virginia LeFevre
  Igor Kabanov
  Gerhardt Bubník
  Pál Vásárhelyi
  Rudolf Zorn
  Suzanne Francis
  Brenda Long
  Lysiane Lauret
  Tsukasa Kimura (substitute)

References

External links
 Official Olympic Report
 Results of Winter Olympics (archived)
 1980 Winter Olympics (with links to all figure skating results)

 
1980 Winter Olympics events
1980
1980 in figure skating
International figure skating competitions hosted by the United States